Miloš Milorad Velimirović (December 10, 1922 – April 18, 2008) was an American musicologist.  Twice a recipient of a Fulbright fellowship, he was considered an international expert in the areas of Byzantine music, the history of Slavonic music, and the history of Italian opera in the 18th century.

Early life 
Velimirović was born in Belgrade, Serbia, Yugoslavia to Milorad and Desanka (Jovanović) Velimirović, a physician and a piano teacher respectively.  In his boyhood in Serbia, he learned to play the violin and piano.  He learnt several languages, and had a lifelong passion for music.  During his adolescent years he studied music history and music theory.  Velimirović began a program of studies in music history at the University of Belgrade, also studying violin and piano at the conservatory.  In 1941, with the invasion of the Axis powers, the university was closed, and Velimirović's studies there were suspended until after the war.

Fieldwork in Yugoslavia 
From 1950 to 1951, Velimirović worked with Harvard University professor Albert Lord in collecting oral epic songs from singers in Yugoslavia.  This fieldwork was a follow-up trip to the work done by another Harvard professor of Classics, Milman Parry, from 1933 to 1935.  Lord himself had assisted Parry in the final stages of that trip.  The material gathered in this trip is discussed most prominently in Lord's 1960 book, The Singer of Tales. Albert and Mary Lou Lord sponsored Velimirović's immigration to the United States in 1952, to enter the graduate studies program at Harvard.  Velimirović received a master's degree (in 1953) and a doctoral degree (in 1957) from Harvard.

Academic career 
Velimirović was a Junior Fellow in Byzantine Studies at Dumbarton Oaks for the 1955/56 and 1956/57 academic years.  From 1957 to 1969, he taught at Yale University. During that time, he was awarded a Fulbright fellowship for research in Greece in the 1963/64 academic year.  Beginning in 1969, until 1973, Velimirović was on the faculty of the University of Wisconsin–Madison.  He taught at the University of Virginia from 1973 to 1993, serving as chair of the McIntire Department of Music from 1974 to 1978.  In 1985, he was awarded a second Fulbright fellowship, to teach abroad in Yugoslavia.  Velimirović retired as a Professor Emeritus in 1993.  After retirement, he continued to reside in Virginia, until his death in 2008, at the age of 85, in Bridgewater.

Recognition 
In 2003, Velimirović was invited to a symposium at the Bolshoi Theatre in Moscow.  As a follow-up to this event, his Russian colleagues presented him with a festschrift volume entitled "Византия и Восточная Европа : литургические и музыкальные связи : к 80-летию доктора Милоша Велимировича" (Byzantium and Eastern Europe: Liturgical and Musical Links – In Honor of the 80th Birthday of Dr. Miloš Velimirović).  The volume was originally written in Russian and included contributions by authors from nine countries. On October 18, 2004, the National and Capodistrian University of Athens awarded an honorary doctorate to Velimirović.

Selected works 
A more detailed bibliography of Velimirović's works through about 1993 is available in a family history Velimirovići by Gojko Antić. Included in the bibliography are entries documenting translations of Velimirović's writings, primarily into Greek, Serbo-Croatian, and Bulgarian.

Books

Papers

References 
Notes

Sources

 
 
 
 
  Александар Васић (Aleksandar Vasic). "Преминуо Милош Велимировић". Политика (Policy), 20. V 2008, Year CV, No. 33954, p. 16. Same in: Ton, Belgrade, July 2008, Year XII, No. 41, p. 2.
  Весна Пено (Vesna Peno). "Милош Велимировић (1922–2008)" (Miloš Velimirović). Музикологија (Musicologia), Belgrade 2008, No. 8, pp. 329–334.

Yugoslav emigrants to the United States
American ethnomusicologists
Slavists
University of Belgrade alumni
Harvard University alumni
University of Wisconsin–Madison faculty
University of Virginia faculty
American people of Serbian descent
Musicians from Belgrade
1922 births
2008 deaths
20th-century American musicologists